Brachymystax tumensis, the blunt-snouted lenok, is a salmonid fish distributed in rivers and lakes in Eastern Asia. It was formerly included in the more widespread species Brachymystax lenok (now known as the sharp-snouted lenok), but more recent research based on differences in morphology and genetics have justified a distinction of the two species.

Brachymystax tumensis is found widely in southeastern Russia and more locally in northeastern and central parts of the country (including Sakhalin), as well as northeastern Mongolia (Amur Basin), northern China and Korea (e.g. Tumen River). In some regions, such as the Amur Basin, the range may overlap with that of B. lenok. Earlier authorities have included the South Korean population in B. tsinlingensis instead of B. tumensis and this appears to be supported by mtDNA (although its exact taxonomic position remains to be determined).

References

tumensis
Fish of Asia
Fish described in 1930
Taxa named by Tamezo Mori